Michailidis is a surname of Pontic Greek origin. Notable persons with that name include:

 Giannis Stergianos-Michailidis (born 1993), Greek football player 
 Chrisostomos Michailidis, (born 1975), Greek football player 
 Ieroklis Michailidis, (born 1960), Greek actor
 Zinon Michailidis, Greek sport shooter
 Vasilis Michailidis (1849–1917), Cypriot poet

Greek-language surnames
Surnames
Patronymic surnames
Surnames from given names